Anolis alayoni, the Guantanamo twig anole, is a species of lizard in the family Dactyloidae. The species is found in Cuba.

References

Anoles
Reptiles of Cuba
Endemic fauna of Cuba
Reptiles described in 1995
Taxa named by Alberto R. Estrada
Taxa named by Stephen Blair Hedges